Aberdare by-election could refer to two by-elections held for the Parliament of the United Kingdom;

1946 Aberdare by-election
1954 Aberdare by-election